Live at Grand Targhee Resort is a live DVD concert of the band, Widespread Panic, filmed at the Grand Targhee Resort in Alta, WY between July 1–3, 2011.

Track listing

July 1, 2011

Disc one
 Ain't Life Grand
 Who Do You Belong To?
 Little Lilly
 Tall Boy
 Tickle The Truth
 Let's Get Down To Business
 Use Me
 Travelin' Man
 You Should Be Glad

Disc two
 Thought Sausage
 B of D
 Machine
 Barstools and Dreamers
 Saint Ex
 Ain't No Use
 Drums
 Ride Me High

Disc three
 Pilgrims
 Chainsaw City
 Greta
 City of Dreams

July 2, 2011

Disc one
 A of D
 Space Wrangler
 Stop Breakin' Down Blues
 Visiting Day
 Weak Brain
 Can't Get High
 Don't Wanna Lose You
 Pigeons
 Contentment Blues
 New Speedway Boogie

Disc two
 From the Cradle
 Radio Child
 Slippin' Into Darkness
 Disco
 Second Skin
 Bear's Gone Fishin' 
 I'm Not Alone

Disc three
 Ribs and Whiskey
 Protein Drink
 Sewing Machine
 Her Dance Needs No Body
 Maggot Brain
 Chilly Water

July 3, 2011

Disc one
 Heroes
 Junior
 Chunk of Coal
 Dirty Side Down
 Jaded Tourist
 Impossible
 Imitation Leather Shoes
 The Last Straw
 Dirty Business
 Fishwater

Disc two
 Tie Your Shoes
 St. Louis
 All Time Low
 Light is Like Water
 Mercy
 Bust It Big
 Drums
 Dream Song
 Rebirtha

Disc three
 Low Spark of High Heeled Boys
 Surprise Valley
 Low Spark of High Heeled Boys
 Henry Parsons Died 
 May Your Glass Be Filled
 Are You Ready For The Country
 Papa's Home

Personnel

Widespread Panic
John Bell — Vocals, Guitar
John "JoJo" Hermann — Keyboards, Vocal
Jimmy Herring - Guitar
Todd Nance — Drums, Vocals
Domingo S. Ortiz - Percussion, Vocals
Dave Schools - Bass, Vocals

Guest musicians 
Jerry Joseph featured on "Light is Like Water" (July 3, 2011)

Widespread Panic video albums
2011 live albums
2011 video albums
Live video albums